Richard Eklund Jr. (born May 3, 1957) is an American former professional boxer who competed from 1975 to 1985. Known as "The Pride of Lowell", he held the USA New England welterweight title twice between 1979 and 1983. He is the half-brother and former trainer of former WBU champion Micky Ward. The 2010 biopic The Fighter is based on the two brothers' fall and rise to the boxing title.

Boxing career 

After an amateur boxing career of 200 bouts, winning 194, Eklund turned professional on August 26, 1975. After losing his debut by 6-round decision to Joe DeFayette, Eklund won 10 straight fights; defeating such opponents as Doug Romano, Terry Rondeau, Carlos Garcia, Randy Milton, and Mike Michaud.

He fought professionally as Dick Eklund; "Dicky" was a nickname used by his family and friends. Before his 1978 match with future world boxing champion Sugar Ray Leonard, Eklund's most impressive victory was over undefeated Rufus Miller (6–0–1) in 1976.

Eklund's most notable fight was on July 18, 1978, against Sugar Ray Leonard at the Hynes Memorial Auditorium in Boston, Massachusetts. He went the distance against Leonard, who eventually won the fight by unanimous decision. During the fight, Eklund was knocked down twice. In the ninth round, the fighters got wrapped up and Leonard tripped, which was counted as a trip by the referee. In the film The Fighter, Eklund claims to have knocked down Leonard in their match. While the film acknowledges the slip, a video of the fight shows a punch/push and Leonard falling to the canvas on his back. The official verdict by the referee Tommy Rawson was a slip. In an interview regarding the knockdown, Leonard said, "I slipped."

Eklund's fastest victory was a first-round knockout over C.J. Faison in Montreal, Canada on February 10, 1981. According to the 1983 Ring Record Book, Eklund knocked out Canada's Allan Clarke in 9 rounds on August 25, 1981. Clarke's record was listed by the Ring as 21–4–1. On October 25, 1983, Eklund defeated James Lucas to win the USA New England Welterweight Title. Following a rematch victory over Lucas in 1985, Eklund never fought again.

Eklund's fighting career spanned 10 years from 1975 to 1985, during which he compiled a professional career record of 19 wins, including four by knockout, and 10 losses.

After Eklund's fighting career ended, he became the trainer of his half-brother, noted former boxer Micky Ward. Eklund was Ward's full-time trainer for 26 fights, from Ward's professional debut in 1985 until his first retirement in 1991. Three of Ward's post-retirement fights were voted fight of the year by The Ring. Eklund served as Ward's trainer until his second retirement, after his third fight with Arturo Gatti on June 7, 2003. Ward's biography, written by Bob Halloran and titled Irish Thunder: The Hard Life and Times of Micky Ward, discusses much of Eklund's life and career.

Eklund now works as a personal trainer and boxing coach in New England. He also travels the United States with Micky Ward, giving motivational speeches to college students.

Personal life 
Paramount Pictures' 2010 drama The Fighter chronicles the rise of Eklund's younger half-brother Micky Ward. Directed by David O. Russell, the film stars Christian Bale as Eklund and Mark Wahlberg as Ward. At the 2011 Screen Actors Guild Awards, Eklund made a surprise appearance on stage with Christian Bale as the latter accepted the award for Outstanding Supporting Actor for his portrayal of Eklund. Bale also won a Golden Globe and an Academy Award for his performance. During his Academy Award acceptance speech, he thanked Eklund and Ward, who were in the audience.

Eklund was also featured on the HBO documentary High on Crack Street: Lost Lives in Lowell which showed his fall from boxing grace because of his addiction to crack cocaine. In the documentary, Eklund was sentenced to a long prison term for crimes he committed to feed his crack addiction.

Professional boxing record

See also 

 Notable boxing families

References

External links 

1957 births
Living people
American male boxers
Boxers from Massachusetts
Sportspeople from Lowell, Massachusetts
Welterweight boxers